Eunomia colombina is a moth of the subfamily Arctiinae. It was described by Johan Christian Fabricius in 1793. It is found on the Antilles and possibly in Honduras and Brazil.

References

 

Arctiinae
Moths described in 1793